Aramean kings were kings of the ancient Arameans, and rulers of various Aramean states that existed throughout the Levant and Mesopotamia during the 14th and 13th centuries BC, before being absorbed by various other empires such as the Neo-Assyrian Empire, Neo-Babylonian Empire and the Achaemenid Empire.

Kings

Aramean kings are known from various inscriptions, and some are also mentioned in the Hebrew Bible.

Aram-Damascus

Bit-Agusi

Bit-Gabbari (Sam'al)

Kasku

Aram-Zobah

Bit Bahiani

Hamath

Aram-Naharaim

Bit-Zamani

Bit-Adini

See also

References

Sources

 
 
 
 

 
King lists
Lists of monarchs
Syria-related lists
Iraq-related lists